The badminton competition at the 1966 British Empire and Commonwealth Games took place in Kingston, Jamaica from 4 to 9 August 1966. It was the inaugural appearance for badminton at the games.

Medal winners

Final results

Results

Men's singles

Women's singles

Men's doubles

Women's doubles

Mixed doubles

References

1966
1966 in badminton
1966 British Empire and Commonwealth Games events
Badminton in Jamaica